Muaythai was featured in the World Games official programme for the first time at the 2017 World Games in Wrocław, Poland. It has been played at all editions since then. Muaythai was added to the World Games following the decision of the IWGA Annual General Meeting in May 2013. 

The International Federation of Muaythai Associations is governing body for muaythai at the World Games. 


Current events

Men

Featherweight (57 kg)

Light welterweight (63.5 kg)

Welterweight (67 kg)

Light middleweight (71 kg)

Light heavyweight (81 kg)

Heavyweight (91 kg)

Women

Light flyweight (48 kg)

Flyweight (51 kg)

Bantamweight (54 kg)

Featherweight (57 kg)

Lightweight (60 kg)

Light welterweight (63.5 kg)

Discontinued events

Men

Bantamweight (54 kg)

Middleweight (75 kg)

Statistics

Medals per year

Notes

References

Muaythai
medalists
World Games medalists